Amphibolurus is a genus of lizards in the family Agamidae. The genus is endemic to Australia.

Description
Characteristics of the genus Amphibolurus include:
 Moderate size [snout–vent length ]
 Long limbs and long tail
 One to five crests consisting of enlarged, sometimes spinose scales (one nuchal and vertebral crest, sometime one or two dorsal crests on each side)
 Tympanum exposed
 One to 11 femoral pores and one to three preanal pores on each side
 Pattern usually includes three broad pale dorsal stripes, and some blotches on a usually brown ground coloration
 Different from the similar species Lophognathus and Gowidon due to more heterogeneous arrangement of scales. They also differ from Gowidon due to more dorsal rows of enlarged, spinose scales.

Habitat
Amphibolurus lizards inhabit open forests, woodlands, and the vegetation around water courses in southern, eastern, and central Australia.

Behaviour
Species in the genus Amphibolurus are partially arboreal and are often found perching on trunks and branches. Lizards of this genus are swift and shy, and when disturbed, they can engage in bipedal running.

Species
The following species are recognized as being valid, according to the Reptile Database.
Amphibolurus burnsi  – Burn's dragon 
Amphibolurus centralis  – Centralian lashtail
Amphibolurus muricatus  – jacky dragon 
Amphibolurus norrisi  – Mallee Heath lashtail

Nota bene: A binomial authority in parentheses indicates that the species was originally described in a genus other than Amphibolurus.

References

Further reading

External Links

 
Agamid lizards of Australia
Lizard genera
Taxa named by Johann Georg Wagler